King's Highway 27, commonly referred to as Highway 27, is a provincially maintained highway in the Canadian province of Ontario, much of which is now cared for by the city of Toronto, York Region and Simcoe County. The Ministry of Transportation of Ontario was once responsible for the length of the route, when it ran from Long Branch to Highway 93 in Waverley. Highway27 followed a mostly straight route throughout its length, as it passed through the suburbs of Toronto, then north of Kleinburg the vast majority of the highway was surrounded by rural farmland. Today, only the southernmost  from Highway 427 north to Mimico Creek is under provincial jurisdiction.

Highway27 was created in 1927, connecting Barrie with Penetanguishene. It was extended south to Schomberg in 1934, and later to Toronto by the late 1930s. The route served as a redundancy to Yonge Street, and later Highway 400. Through the 1950s, the portion of Highway27 between Evans Avenue and north of Eglinton Avenue was expanded into a four-laned dual highway known as the Toronto Bypass (which included portions of the new Highway401 through Toronto). Beginning in the mid-1960s, this dual highway was expanded into the current collector–express system and renumbered as Highway427 upon completion at the end of 1971. The majority of the remainder of the route was decommissioned in the late 1990s; the majority of the former highway is now known as York Regional Road27 and Simcoe County Road27, though it retains its Highway27 name within the City of Toronto.

Route description 

As of 2021, Highway27 begins to the south at the offramps from the collector lanes of Highway427 as a four-lane divided highway. While the express lanes, constituting the mainline Highway427, curve around the Richview Memorial Cemetery and shift west by approximately 1km (0.6mi), the collector lanes transitioning to Highway27 continue northward and cross Eglinton Avenue at a half-cloverleaf interchange (originally meant for the never-built Richview Expressway before diving under Highway401. Highway27 ends north of Mimico creek at the end of the divided highway, transitioning into an arterial road of the same name.

Former route (1997) 
Through Etobicoke, it encountered mostly industrial surroundings, meeting Dixon Road at a cloverleaf interchange near the Toronto Congress Centre, then crossing (but not interchanging with) Highway 409. Highway27 followed a mostly straight route throughout its length, as it passed through the suburbs of Toronto, then north of Kleinburg the vast majority of the highway was surrounded by rural farmland. Within the Regional Municipality of York, Highway27 travelled along the 9th concession road of Vaughan and King Township, approximately 16 km west of Yonge Street. It passed along the western edge of suburban sprawl in Vaughan, near the community of Woodbridge. South of Kleinburg, the highway dipped into the Humber River valley, connecting with Islington Avenue. North of the valley, it continued through King Township into the Oak Ridges Moraine, dividing the village of Nobleton and entering Schomberg immediately south of Highway 9, north of which the highway entered Simcoe County.

North of Highway9, the route curved  to the east, then continued north, parallel to Highway400. It followed the townline between Tecumseth and West Gwillimbury townships. It travelled through the village of Bond Head and thereafter met Highway 89 in Cookstown. As the highway approached Barrie, it curved and followed Essa Road northeast until it met Highway400. Through Barrie, it was concurrent with Highway400 between Exit94 and Exit98, after which it was concurrent with Highway 26 along Bayfield Street, travelling north and exiting the city. After passing through the village of Elmvale and the end of Highway 92, the highway abruptly turned to the east to a junction with Highway 93 in the community of Waverley, which assumed the section north of here in the 1980s. Continuing north again, the highway meandered towards Georgian Bay, departing from the old Penetanguishene Road at Mertz's Corner. The route curved around the western side of a large marsh before entering the community of Wyebridge, where it crossed the Wye River. Several kilometres north of Wyebridge, Highway27 met Highway 12 on the outskirts of Midland. It then rejoined Penetanguishene Road and continued north into Penetanguishene, ending at the shoreline of Penetanguishene Harbour.

History 

Highway27 was first designated between Barrie and Penetanguishene on September14, 1927. On March28, 1934 it was extended south to Schomberg via county roads south of Barrie. On August12, 1936, Browns Line and Eaton Road were designated as part of Highway27, creating an isolated section of the route between Long Branch and Elder Mills (at the modern intersection of Rutherford Road). On the same date, the road between Schomberg and Kleinburg was designated as part of Highway27, leaving a gap between Elder Mills and Kleinburg, through the Humber valley. This gap was closed beginning in late 1936.

In the mid-1950s, the Toronto Bypass was constructed between Highway 2A and the Queen Elizabeth Way (QEW), widening Highway27 to a four lane freeway in the process. This section was reconstructed again starting in 1968 and continuing until the early 1970s to turn it into a twelve-lane collector-express system. The former was opened to traffic on November14, 1969, while the latter required several more years of construction staging, fully opening on December4, 1971 (though portions were opened in the weeks prior to that), just prior to the renumbering of Highway27 as Highway427. The rest of the route was rebuilt prior to the completion of these interchanges. The isolated section of Highway27 following Browns Line from south of the QEW to Lake Shore Boulevard (then Highway 2) was subsequently decommissioned.

On June21, 1968, a new bypass north of Schomberg opened. Originally, northbound traffic had to turn east at Highway9 then north at Leonard Road; a smooth curve is visible at this latter intersection, though it now forms the driveways of several residences. The new bypass made Highway27 a through route at Highway9. In 1982, the section between Waverley and Penetanguishene was renumbered as an extension of Highway93. The remainder of the route, from Eglinton Avenue north to Waverley, was decommissioned on January 1, 1998. Within the City of Toronto it is locally maintained, and still known as Highway27; a proposal to rename it to "Etobicoke Drive" was rejected. North of Toronto, it is known as York Regional Road27 and Simcoe County Road27, depending on the jurisdiction.

Major intersections

See also 
 Cancelled expressways in Toronto

References 

Toronto highways
027